Bluefield International Academy was a residential boarding school located in Bluefield, West Virginia. The admission of international students from 4th to 8th grade was approved in 2007 by the U.S. Immigration and Customs Enforcement. The school was a division of the International Education and Research Foundation, Inc.

According to the West Virginia Secretary of State, the foundation running the school was voluntarily dissolved in December, 2017.

References

 Gurukulam model school in the US

Schools in Mercer County, West Virginia
Private high schools in West Virginia
International schools in the United States
Private middle schools in West Virginia
Private elementary schools in West Virginia
Boarding schools in West Virginia
Buildings and structures in Bluefield, West Virginia